Apamea cuculliformis is a moth of the family Noctuidae. It is found in western North America, including California, Washington and British Columbia.

This wingspan is about 43 mm.

External links
Images

Apamea (moth)
Moths of North America
Moths described in 1875
Taxa named by Augustus Radcliffe Grote